Lyxose is an aldopentose — a monosaccharide containing five carbon atoms, and including an aldehyde functional group. It has chemical formula . It is a C'-2 carbon epimer of the sugar xylose. The name "lyxose" comes from reversing the prefix "xyl" in "xylose".

Lyxose occurs only rarely in nature, for example, as a component of bacterial glycolipids.

References

External links
 E. coli K-12 Pathway: L-lyxose degradation

Aldopentoses